The World Group II was the second highest level of Fed Cup competition in 1999. Winning nations advanced to the 2000 World Group, and the losing nations were demoted to the World Group II Play-offs.

Netherlands vs. Belgium

Belarus vs. Czech Republic

Austria vs. Australia

Germany vs. Japan

References

See also
Fed Cup structure
 Calendar - Fed Cup - Draws & Results

World Group II